Radha Raman was an Indian politician and freedom fighter of Indian National Congress who served as Member of 2nd Lok Sabha from Chandni Chowk Lok Sabha constituency and President of Delhi Pradesh Congress Committee on 24 March 1970. He also served as Chief Executive Councillor of Delhi. He was the first politician to represent Chandni Chowk in Lok Sabha.

Personal life 
He was born on 13 June 1933.

References 

India MPs 1957–1962
Presidents of Delhi Pradesh Congress Committee
Indian National Congress politicians from Delhi